Life in Pieces is an American sitcom television series created by Justin Adler and which premiered on CBS on September 21, 2015 and concluded on June 27, 2019. The series was produced by 40 or 50 Years, Inc., Kapital Entertainment in association with 20th Century Fox Television, with Adler serving as showrunner.  Life in Pieces was canceled by CBS after four seasons on May 10, 2019.

Premise
The series chronicles the lives of three generations of the Short family as they go about their daily lives in Los Angeles County. Each episode is told as four short stories, typically one for three of the four Short family branches and one that involves the fourth and ties the other three stories together.

Episodes

Cast

Family tree

Main
 Colin Hanks as Gregory "Greg" Short: Husband of Jen Short; youngest child of John and Joan Short; younger brother of Matt Short and Heather (Short) Hughes; father of Lark and Talia Short; worked for a crowd funding website until he quit his job in "Crytunes Divorce Tablet Ring". He ends up running a small company by accident in "Graffiti Cute Jewelry Shots".
 Betsy Brandt as Heather (Short) Hughes: Wife of Dr. Tim Hughes; oldest child and only daughter of John and Joan Short; older sister of Matt and Greg Short; mother of Tyler, Samantha, and Sophia Hughes; a stay at home mom.
 Thomas Sadoski as Matthew "Matt" Short: Divorced shortly before season 1 began (wife was Bonnie); middle child and oldest son of John and Joan Short; brother of Heather and Greg Short; dates Colleen Brandon Ortega until the end of "Hair Recital Rainbow Mom". He and Colleen get back together in "Cinderella Fantasy Prom Dougie". They become engaged in the second half of the two-part season 1 finale, "Crytunes Divorce Tablet Ring". They get married at the end of season 2, "Poison Fire Teats Universe". They adopt Lucas, an orphan boy, before season 4 episode 6.
 Zoe Lister-Jones as Jennifer "Jen" Collins Short: A lawyer; mother of Lark and Talia Short; wife of Greg Short. She announced that she is pregnant with their second child in season 1 finale, "Crytunes Divorce Tablet Ring"; however, it was later revealed that she had a miscarriage in the season 2 premiere, "Annulled Roommate Pill Shower". She told her husband that she is pregnant again in "Video Piercing Model Hangover". She gives birth to their second daughter in "Lost Math Art Glam".
 Dan Bakkedahl as Dr. Timothy "Tim" Hughes, M.D.: An ENT doctor; husband of Heather (Short) Hughes; father of Tyler, Samantha, and Sophia Hughes.
 Angelique Cabral as Colleen Brandon Ortega Short: Granddaughter of Tonita; owns a male puppy named "Princess"; dates Matt Short until the end of "Hair Recital Rainbow Mom". She and Matt get back together in "Cinderella Fantasy Prom Dougie". They get engaged in "Crytunes Divorce Tablet Ring". They get married at the end of season 2, "Poison Fire Teats Universe". They adopt Lucas, an orphan boy, before season 4 episode 6.
 Niall Cunningham as Tyler Hughes: Oldest child and only son of Tim and Heather Hughes; brother of Samantha and Sophia Hughes; dated Clementine from "Babe Secret Phone Germs" until they married before "Crytunes Divorce Tablet Ring".  Beginning of season 3, they are getting divorced.  It was mutual and decided to become friends. They got back together in the Season 3 episode "Toilet Shaving Stuck Fertility".
 Holly J. Barrett as Samantha "Sam" Hughes: Middle child and older daughter of Tim and Heather Hughes; sister of Tyler and Sophia Hughes.
 Giselle Eisenberg as Sophia Hughes: Youngest child and younger daughter of Tim and Heather Hughes; sister of Tyler and Samantha Hughes.
 James Brolin as John Doe Short: Retired airline pilot; partner of Joan (Pirkle) Short; father of Heather (Short) Hughes, Matt Short, and Greg Short; owns a female Yorkie named Tank since "Sexting Mall Lemonade Heartbreak". During season two when John was putting together his audition tap for "Survivor", he introduces himself as "John Bertram Short". In season one, he alludes to having served in the US Air Force and even makes reference to the US 101st Airborne Division.
 Dianne Wiest as Dr. Joan (Pirkle) Short: Partner of John Short; therapist; daughter of GiGi Pirkle; mother of Heather (Short) Hughes, Matt Short, and Greg Short. She and John are still together but, in "Crytunes Divorce Tablet Ring", they confessed to their kids that they got divorced in 1980 in protest when their best friends, a lesbian couple, couldn't get married.
 Hunter King as Clementine Hughes: (recurring season 1, main seasons 2–4) Daughter of Mary-Lynn; niece of Spencer (her "uncle-dad"); dated Tyler Hughes from "Babe Secret Phone Germs" until they married before "Crytunes Divorce Tablet Ring". At the beginning of season 3, they mutually decided to get a divorce; they remained friends. They got back together in the Season 3 episode "Therapy Cheating Shoes Movie".
 Ana Sophia Heger as Lark Short: (main seasons 3–4) Oldest daughter of Greg and Jen Short; sister of Talia Short.
 Vivaan Bisoi as Lucas Short: An orphan boy who Matt and Colleen Short adopted before season 4 episode 6.

Recurring
 Ann Guilbert as Shirley "GiGi" Pirkle: Mother of Dr. Joan (Pirkle) Short; widow (husband was Winston); lived at Hidden Harbor (Retirement Community), then lived at Rocking Hill Nursing Home. Following Guilbert's death in June 2016, the GiGi character's death was written into "Eyebrow Anonymous Trapped Gem" as a tribute, and all four stories of the episode revolved around GiGi.
 Jordan Peele as Chad: Ex-fiancé of Colleen.  Chad had some legal troubles and hired Jen's law firm to represent him. He rented his share in Colleen's apartment to Dougie, who was part of his legal team (she's currently Colleen's roommate).
 Fortune Feimster as Dougie: A coworker of Jen; daughter of Jen's boss; member of legal team hired by Chad; Colleen's roommate since the season 1 finale, "Crytunes Divorce Tablet Ring".  Dougie is loud, boisterous, uncouth and abrasive physically and emotionally.  Despite that, she showed a more vulnerable side when she came out of the closet to Colleen and Matt.  She had her very first lesbian kiss with Heather, Tim's wife.  When Matt moved in with Colleen and Dougie, it was discovered that Matt wrestled in high school and both he and Dougie went undefeated in their high school careers.  In the season 2 premiere, "Annulled Roommate Pill Shower", Dougie challenged Matt to a wrestling match to determine whether or not she has to move out of the apartment.  Dougie won the match using her patented "hook, line, and sinker" move to keep her spot in the apartment.
 Martin Mull as Gary Timpkins: neighbor, president of the HOA in the neighborhood Joan lives in and a patient of Joan; a recent widower
 Susan Park as Dr. Sally Hong: Jen's OB/GYN
 Tonita Castro as Tonita: Colleen's grandmother. Tonita was very close to Colleen's ex-fiancée, Chad.
 Mercedes Ruehl as Mia: Colleen's mother. Married four times. Colleen fears she is turning into her mother.
 Bella Shepard as Lexie: one of Samantha's friends
 Ashley Wolff as Jenna: one of Samantha's friends
 Andrew McKeough as Jayden
 Martin Starr as Oscar: an exterminator; a field worker for "Scram! Trappers" animal control & pest removal
 Stephnie Weir as Bernadette
 Rhys Darby as Teddy
 Megan Mullally as Mary-Lynn: mother of Clementine; sister and partner of Spencer
 Nick Offerman as Spencer: brother and partner of Mary-Lynn; parent ("uncle-dad") of Clementine
 Josh Groban as Ian: an Irish salesman of guitars at a music store who often flirts with his female customers
 Russell Peters as Dr. Tak Oh, M.D.: coworker of Tim; widower (wife was Jackie)
 Wayne Federman as Dr. Saul Antro
 Angela Malhotra as Nurse Silvie: coworker of Tim
 Cary Elwes as Professor Sinclair Wilde: Joan's creative writing teacher since "Dinner Professor Steps Lesbian"
 Anne Stedman as Sangria: Colleen's stepmom
 Matt Cornett as Ryan: Samantha's boyfriend
 Joey King as Morgan: a pregnant 17-year-old from Modesto that (during the early part of season 4) intended to have her infant adopted, possibly by Matt and Colleen

Production
On January 22, 2015, CBS placed a pilot order, under the title Life in Pieces. The pilot was written by Justin Adler and directed by Jason Winer. On May 8, 2015, CBS placed a series order. The first season was picked up for a full 22-episode order on October 27, 2015. On May 11, 2016, CBS renewed the show for a second season, which premiered on October 27, 2016. Life in Pieces was renewed for a third season on March 23, 2017, which premiered on November 2, 2017. Life in Pieces was renewed for a fourth season on May 12, 2018, which premiered on April 18, 2019.

On May 10, 2019, it was announced that CBS cancelled Life in Pieces. A combination of factors, including declining ratings, CBS's desire to have an ownership stake, and the network needing to clear space in getting four new sitcoms in the fall 2019 and mid-season schedule, led to the show's demise.

Broadcast
The show debuted on September 21, 2015 on CBS. The first five episodes aired on Mondays, before it was moved on November 5, 2015, to a new time slot of 8:30 p.m. ET/PT (7:30 p.m. CT) on Thursdays, directly after CBS finished its NFL broadcasts. In the United States, all seasons are available on Hulu.  The first season airs on Netflix, with all seasons being available in Canada.

In the United Kingdom, all seasons are available on Amazon Prime and Life In Pieces is shown season by season on Comedy Central UK and Ireland.

Home media
20th Century Fox Home Entertainment released region-free, MOD versions of the first two seasons on Amazon on May 22, 2018. This was followed by the third season on June 12, 2018 and the fourth on July 9, 2019.

Reception
The first season on review aggregator website Rotten Tomatoes reports a 62% approval rating with an average rating of 6.58/10 based on 39 reviews. The website's consensus reads "Life in Pieces strong cast delivers funny, offbeat stories even if they're not always relatable". On Metacritic, the series holds a score of 64 out of 100 based on 24 reviews, indicating "generally favorable reviews."

Ratings

References

External links
 
 
 Life in Pieces at The Futon Critic

2010s American single-camera sitcoms
2015 American television series debuts
2019 American television series endings
CBS original programming
English-language television shows
Nonlinear narrative television series
Television series about marriage
Television series about siblings
Television series about families
Television series by 20th Century Fox Television
Television shows set in Los Angeles County, California
Television series by Kapital Entertainment